Ettersburg (also, Etter) is a locality in Humboldt County, California.

History

A post office operated at Ettersburg from 1902 to 1906 and from 1915 to 1965. The settlement is named for its founder, horticulturist Albert Etter.

Development of Ettersburg
Albert's German-born mother, Wilhelmina (Kern) Etter (d. 1913) was skilled at cultivating plants, and Etter showed a talent for hybridizing plants in childhood, working with apples, peaches, dahlias, and strawberries by the time he was twelve. He attended public school and by the end of his teens was looking out for a site where he could continue his plant-breeding experiments. On a fishing trip to the Mattole River Valley, he found a section of land above Bear Creek and in 1894 he staked a claim to it. This area along the Pacific coast in the King Range has wet winters and hot summers, and Albert later attributed his success partly to his choice of location. The site where Albert developed his ranch was subsequently named after him, first as Etter and then as Ettersburg.

Etter managed the ranch with three of his brothers, George, Fred, and August; and another four of his siblings also lived nearby. While Etter focused on plant breeding, his brothers oversaw other kinds of farming and stockkeeping operations. The ranch holdings, operated under the business name Etter Brothers, eventually reached 800 acres in size. Although the Etter Brothers firm and the Ettersburg Experimental Place became internationally known among plant breeders, and Etter renowned as "the Luther Burbank of Humboldt County", they never made more than a modest living from the land. For one thing, they were far removed from the main trucking and rail routes, and for another, new plant hybrids were not protected by the patent system until 1930.

Geography

Nearby cities are: Shelter Cove (8.4 miles south-southwest), Redway (9.3 miles east), Garberville (11 miles east/southeast) 
Benbow, (12.2 miles ESE), Weott (13.3 miles NNE), Redcrest (18.3 miles N), Alderpoint (20.6 miles E).

According to the USGS Site Map, the city has a drainage area .

Ettersburg is in the Lost Coast region which includes Pacific Ocean coast, and several rivers. The next big city is Eureka, principal city and county seat of Humboldt County.

The city then gives way to hills and mountains of the rugged coast range, which quickly exceed  in elevation.

Climate

Ettersburg experiences mild to warm (but not hot) and dry summers with some rainy days, with not many average monthly temperatures above .  According to the Köppen Climate Classification system, Ettersburg has a warm-summer Mediterranean climate, abbreviated "Csc" on climate maps. There are cool winters during which intense rainfall occurs. It has warm, dry summers with moderate rainfall through the summer months. Snow in Ettersburg is very rare, occurring every 20 to 30 years in winter months.
There are on average 120 days with measurable precipitation which makes Ettersburg a Mediterranean climate.

Ettersburg's Köppen classification and climate is similar to locations such as parts of Balmaceda, Chile, in high elevations of Corsica, Haleakala Summit in Hawaii and the Cascades or Sierra-Nevada-ranges.

Education

Ettersburg once had an Elementary school from 1980 to 2012 serving 3 Grades. The next school district is either in Shelter Cove, Whitehorn or in Garberville.

References

Former settlements in Humboldt County, California
1902 establishments in California